

34001–34100 

|-id=002
| 34002 Movsesian ||  || Karina Movsesian (born 1999) was awarded best of category and first place in the 2017 Intel International Science and Engineering Fair for her biochemistry project. She also received the Dudley R. Herschbach Award. She attends the Prvni Ceske Gymnazium v Karlovych Varech, Karlovy Vary, Czech Republic. || 
|-id=003
| 34003 Ivozell ||  || Ivo Zell (born 1998) was awarded best of category and first place in the 2017 Intel International Science and Engineering Fair for his engineering mechanics project. He also received the Gordon E. Moore Award. He attends the Internatsschule Schloss Hansenberg, Geisenheim-Johannesberg, Germany. || 
|-id=004
| 34004 Gregorini ||  || Loretta Gregorini, astronomer who concentrate in the field of radioastronomy and observational cosmology || 
|-id=010
| 34010 Tassiloschwarz ||  || Tassilo Constantin Schwarz (born 1999) was awarded best of category and first place in the 2017 Intel International Science and Engineering Fair for his robotics and intelligent machines project. He also received the Cultural and Scientific Visit to China Award. He attended the Johannes Heidenhain Gymnasium, Traunreut, Germany. Currently, he studies at ETH Zurich. || 
|-id=011
| 34011 Divyakranthi ||  || Divya Kranthi (born 2000) was awarded second place in the 2017 Intel International Science and Engineering Fair for her biochemistry team project. She attends the Ambedkar College, Nagpur, India. || 
|-id=012
| 34012 Prashaant ||  || Prashaant Ranganathan (born 1999) was awarded best of category and first place in the 2017 Intel International Science and Engineering Fair for his environmental engineering project. He also received the Philip V. Streich Memorial Award. He attends the Carmel Junior College, Jamshedpur, Jharkhand, India. || 
|-id=014
| 34014 Pingali ||  || Sahithi Rohini Pingali (born 2000) was awarded second place in the 2017 Intel International Science and Engineering Fair for her earth and environmental sciences project. She attends the Inventure Academy, Bengaluru, Karnataka, India. || 
|-id=016
| 34016 Chaitanya ||  || Chaitanya (born 1999) was awarded second place in the 2017 Intel International Science and Engineering Fair for his biomedical engineering team project. He attends the Little Rock Indian School, Brahmavar, Karnataka, India. || 
|-id=017
| 34017 Geeve ||  || Geeve (born 1999) was awarded second place in the 2017 Intel International Science and Engineering Fair for his biomedical engineering team project. He attends the Little Rock Indian School, Brahmavar, Karnataka, India. || 
|-id=021
| 34021 Suhanijain ||  || Suhani Sachin Jain (born 2000) was awarded second place in the 2017 Intel International Science and Engineering Fair for her biochemistry team project. She attends the Taywade College, Nagpur, India. || 
|-id=024
| 34024 Cormaclarkin ||  || Cormac James Larkin (born 1997) was awarded second place in the 2017 Intel International Science and Engineering Fair for his physics and astronomy project. He attends the Colaiste an Spioraid Naoimh, Cork City, Munster, Ireland. || 
|-id=025
| 34025 Caolannbrady ||  || Caolann Ellen Brady (born 1999) was awarded second place in the 2017 Intel International Science and Engineering Fair for her biomedical and health sciences project. She attends the St. Wolstan's Community School, Celbridge, Leinster, Ireland. || 
|-id=026
| 34026 Valpagliarino ||  || Valerio Pagliarino (born 2000) was awarded best of category and first place in the 2017 Intel International Science and Engineering Fair for his embedded systems project. He also received the Intel Foundation Young Scientist Award. He attends the I.I.S. Nicola Pellati, Nizza Monferrato, Asti, Italy. || 
|-id=028
| 34028 Wuhuiyi ||  || Huiyi Wu (born 1999) was awarded second place in the 2017 Intel International Science and Engineering Fair for her energy project. She attends the Ichikawa Gakuen Ichikawa High School, Ichikawa, Chiba, Japan. || 
|-id=030
| 34030 Tabuchi ||  || Kotaro Tabuchi (born 1999) was awarded second place in the 2017 Intel International Science and Engineering Fair for his engineering mechanics project. He attends the Nanzan Boys' Senior High School, Nagoya, Aichi, Japan. || 
|-id=031
| 34031 Fukumitsu ||  || Nodoka Fukumitsu (born 1998) was awarded second place in the 2017 Intel International Science and Engineering Fair for her animal sciences project. She attends the Shimane Prefectural Masuda High School, Masuda, Shimane, Japan. || 
|-id=034
| 34034 Shehadeh ||  || Ayah Hayel Shehadeh (born 2000) was awarded second place in the 2017 Intel International Science and Engineering Fair for her chemistry team project. She attends the Al-Hasaad Al-Tarbawi School, Amman, Jordan. || 
|-id=038
| 34038 Abualragheb ||  || Bayan Osama Abu Alragheb (born 2000) was awarded second place in the 2017 Intel International Science and Engineering Fair for her chemistry team project. She attends the Al-Hasaad Al-Tarbawi School, Amman, Jordan. || 
|-id=039
| 34039 Torsteinvik ||  || Torstein Vik (born 1999) was awarded second place in the 2017 Intel International Science and Engineering Fair for his math team project. He attends the Fagerlia Videregaende Skole, Alesund, More og Romsdal, Norway. || 
|-id=042
| 34042 Espeseth ||  || Ane Kristine Espeseth (born 1998) was awarded second place in the 2017 Intel International Science and Engineering Fair for her math team project. She attends the Fagerlia Videregaende Skole, Alesund, More og Romsdal, Norway. || 
|-id=044
| 34044 Obafial ||  || Nadine Antonette Obafial (born 2000) was awarded second place in the 2017 Intel International Science and Engineering Fair for her plant sciences team project. She attends the Davao City National High School, Davao City, Philippines. || 
|-id=047
| 34047 Gloria ||  || Rubeliene Chezka Fernandez Gloria (born 2001) was awarded second place in the 2017 Intel International Science and Engineering Fair for her plant sciences team project. She attends the Davao City National High School, Davao City, Philippines. || 
|-id=049
| 34049 Myrelleangela ||  || Myrelle Angela T. Colas (born 2001) was awarded second place in the 2017 Intel International Science and Engineering Fair for her plant sciences team project. She attends the Davao City National High School, Davao City, Philippines. || 
|-id=053
| 34053 Carlquines ||  || Carl Joshua Tiangco Quines (born 2000) was awarded second place in the 2017 Intel International Science and Engineering Fair for his math team project. He attends the Valenzuela City School of Mathematics and Science, Valenzuela, Manila, Philippines. || 
|-id=063
| 34063 Mariamakarova ||  || Maria Makarova (born 1999) was awarded second place in the 2017 Intel International Science and Engineering Fair for her chemistry team project. She attends the Moscow Chemical Lyceum, Moscow, Russia. || 
|-id=077
| 34077 Yoshiakifuse ||  || Yoshiaki Fuse, father of astronomer and Subaru Telescope staff member Tetsuru Fuse || 
|-id=079
| 34079 Samoylova ||  || Alexandra Samoylova (born 1999) was awarded second place in the 2017 Intel International Science and Engineering Fair for her chemistry team project. She attends the Moscow Chemical Lyceum, Moscow, Russia. || 
|-id=080
| 34080 Clarakeng ||  || Clara Keng (born 1999) was awarded second place in the 2017 Intel International Science and Engineering Fair for her materials science team project. She attends the Raffles Institution, Singapore. || 
|-id=081
| 34081 Chowkitmun ||  || Chow Kit Mun (born 1999) was awarded second place in the 2017 Intel International Science and Engineering Fair for her materials science team project. She attends the River Valley High School, Singapore. || 
|-id=083
| 34083 Feretova ||  || Miriam Feretova (born 1999) was awarded second place in the 2017 Intel International Science and Engineering Fair for her animal sciences team project. She attends the Grammar School of St. Nicholas, Presov, Presovsky, Slovakia. || 
|-id=088
| 34088 Satokosuka ||  || Kosuke Sato, the winner of the 2008 Space Day Award painting competition for elementary school || 
|-id=089
| 34089 Smoter ||  || Samuel Smoter (born 1999) was awarded second place in the 2017 Intel International Science and Engineering Fair for his animal sciences team project. He attends the Grammar School of St. Nicholas, Presov, Presovsky, Slovakia. || 
|-id=090
| 34090 Cewhang ||  || Clairisse Eunhae Whang (born 2000) was awarded second place in the 2017 Intel International Science and Engineering Fair for her biomedical and health sciences project. She attends the Academy for Medical Science Technology, Hackensack, New Jersey, U.S.A. || 
|-id=100
| 34100 Thapa ||  || Devina Thapa (born 1999) was awarded second place in the 2017 Intel International Science and Engineering Fair for her translational medical science project. She attends the Academy of Science, Sterling, Virginia, U.S.A. || 
|}

34101–34200 

|-
| 34101 Hesrivastava ||  || Hemant Srivastava (born 1999) was awarded second place in the 2017 Intel International Science and Engineering Fair for his translational medical science project. He attends the Alabama School of Fine Arts, Birmingham, Alabama, U.S.A. || 
|-id=102
| 34102 Shawnzhang ||  || Shawn Brian Zhang (born 2000) was awarded second place in the 2017 Intel International Science and Engineering Fair for his physics and astronomy team project. He attends the Amador Valley, Pleasanton, California, U.S.A. || 
|-id=103
| 34103 Suganthkannan ||  || Suganth Kannan (born 1999) was awarded second place in the 2017 Intel International Science and Engineering Fair for his chemistry project. He attends the American Heritage School, Plantation, Florida, U.S.A. || 
|-id=104
| 34104 Jeremiahpate ||  || Jeremiah Thomas Pate (born 1998) was awarded best of category and first place in the 2017 Intel International Science and Engineering Fair for his translational medical science project. He also received the Dudley R. Herschbach Award. He attends the BASIS Oro Valley, Arizona. || 
|-id=106
| 34106 Sakhrani ||  || Neeraj Sakhrani (born 1999) was awarded second place in the 2017 Intel International Science and Engineering Fair for his earth and environmental sciences project. He attends the Bronx High School of Science, Bronx, New York, U.S.A. || 
|-id=107
| 34107 Kashfiarahman ||  || Kashfia Nehrin Rahman (born 2000) was awarded first place in the 2017 Intel International Science and Engineering Fair for her behavioral and social sciences project. She attends the Brookings High School, Brookings, South Dakota, U.S.A. || 
|-id=123
| 34123 Uedayukika || 2000 QD || Yukika Ueda (born 1994), the prizewinner in the 2008 Space-Day Award painting competition || 
|-id=127
| 34127 Adamnayak ||  || Adam C. Nayak (born 2000) was awarded best of category and first place in the 2017 Intel International Science and Engineering Fair for his earth and environmental sciences project. He attends the Cleveland High School, Portland, Oregon, U.S.A. || 
|-id=128
| 34128 Hannahbrown ||  || Hannah Louise Brown (born 1998) was awarded second place in the 2017 Intel International Science and Engineering Fair for her behavioral and social sciences project. She attends the Dobbs Ferry High School, Dobbs Ferry, New York, U.S.A. || 
|-id=129
| 34129 Madisonsneve ||  || Madison Andrea Sneve (born 1999) was awarded first place in the 2017 Intel International Science and Engineering Fair for her cellular and molecular biology project. She attends the duPont Manual High School, Louisville, Kentucky, U.S.A. || 
|-id=130
| 34130 Isabellaivy ||  || Isabella Ivy Bowland (born 2000) was awarded best of category and first place in the 2017 Intel International Science and Engineering Fair for her plant sciences project. She attends the Fairview High School, Boulder, Colorado, U.S.A. || 
|-id=132
| 34132 Theoguerin ||  || Theo Calvin Guerin (born 1999) was awarded second place in the 2017 Intel International Science and Engineering Fair for his engineering mechanics team project. He attends the Falmouth Academy, Falmouth, Massachusetts, U.S.A. || 
|-id=133
| 34133 Charlesfenske ||  || Charles Johannes Fenske (born 1999) was awarded second place in the 2017 Intel International Science and Engineering Fair for his engineering mechanics team project. He attends the Falmouth Academy, Falmouth, Massachusetts, U.S.A. || 
|-id=134
| 34134 Zlokapa ||  || Alexander Zlokapa (born 1999) was awarded second place in the 2017 Intel International Science and Engineering Fair for his systems software project. He attends the Golden Hills Academy, Danville, California, U.S.A. || 
|-id=135
| 34135 Rahulsubra ||  || Rahul Subramaniam (born 2001) was awarded best of category, first place, and the Scientific and Cultural Visit to India in the 2017 Intel International Science and Engineering Fair for his microbiology project. He attends the Greenwich High School, Greenwich, Connecticut. || 
|-id=137
| 34137 Lonnielinda ||  || Lonnie and Linda Wolfe, parents of the American discoverer Chris Wolfe || 
|-id=138
| 34138 Frasso Sabino ||  || Frasso Sabino, Italy, which hosts the discovering Frasso Sabino Observatory  || 
|-id=139
| 34139 Lucabarcelo ||  || Luca Jose Barcelo (born 2000) was awarded second place in the 2017 Intel International Science and Engineering Fair for his environmental engineering project. He attends the Greenwich High School, Greenwich, Connecticut, U.S.A. || 
|-id=141
| 34141 Antonwu ||  || Anton Wu (born 2000) was awarded second place in the 2017 Intel International Science and Engineering Fair for his math project. He attends the Half Hollow Hills High School East, Dix Hills, New York, U.S.A. || 
|-id=142
| 34142 Sachinkonan ||  || Sachin Ganesh Konan (born 2000) was awarded second place in the 2017 Intel International Science and Engineering Fair for his embedded systems project. He attends the Hamilton High School, Chandler, Arizona, U.S.A. || 
|-id=143
| 34143 Heeric ||  || Eric He (born 2000) was awarded second place in the 2017 Intel International Science and Engineering Fair for his embedded systems project. He attends the High Technology High School, Lincroft, New Jersey, U.S.A. || 
|-id=144
| 34144 Alexandersun ||  || Alexander Karl Sun (born 1999) was awarded second place in the 2017 Intel International Science and Engineering Fair for his behavioral and social sciences team project. He attends the Hillcrest High School, Midvale, Utah, U.S.A. || 
|-id=147
| 34147 Vengadesan ||  || Suryaprakash Vengadesan (born 2000) was awarded second place in the 2017 Intel International Science and Engineering Fair for his materials science project. He attends the Irvine High School, Irvine, California, U.S.A. || 
|-id=148
| 34148 Marchuo ||  || Marc Huo (born 2000) was awarded second place in the 2017 Intel International Science and Engineering Fair for his cellular and molecular biology project. He attends the Jericho High School, Jericho, New York, U.S.A. || 
|-id=152
| 34152 Kendrazhang ||  || Kendra Zhang (born 2000) was awarded best of category and first place in the 2017 Intel International Science and Engineering Fair for her energy project. She also received the European Union Contest for Young Scientists Award. She attends the Jericho High School, Jericho, New York, U.S.A. || 
|-id=153
| 34153 Deeannguo ||  || DeeAnn Guo (born 1999) was awarded second place in the 2017 Intel International Science and Engineering Fair for her behavioral and social sciences project. She attends the John Jay High School, Cross River, New York, U.S.A. || 
|-id=154
| 34154 Anushkanair ||  || Anushka M. Nair (born 2000) was awarded first place in the 2017 Intel International Science and Engineering Fair for her earth and environmental sciences project. She attends the Lake Oswego High School, Lake Oswego, Oregon, U.S.A. || 
|-id=156
| 34156 Gopalakrishnan ||  || Vivek Gopalakrishnan (born 1999) was awarded second place in the 2017 Intel International Science and Engineering Fair for his microbiology project. He attends the Lexington High School, Lexington, Massachusetts, U.S.A. || 
|-id=158
| 34158 Rachelchang ||  || Rachel Chang (born 2000) was awarded second place in the 2017 Intel International Science and Engineering Fair for her environmental engineering team project. She attends the Manhasset High School, Manhasset, New York, U.S.A. || 
|-id=159
| 34159 Ryanthorpe ||  || Ryan Matthew Thorpe (born 2000) was awarded second place in the 2017 Intel International Science and Engineering Fair for his environmental engineering team project. He attends the Manhasset High School, Manhasset, New York, U.S.A. || 
|-id=161
| 34161 Michaellee ||  || Michael Yoomin Lee (born 1998) was awarded best of category and first place in the 2017 Intel International Science and Engineering Fair for his systems software project. He also received the Intel Foundation Cultural and Scientific Visit to China Award. He attends the Manhasset High School, Manhasset, New York, U.S.A. || 
|-id=162
| 34162 Yegnesh ||  || Karthik Yegnesh (born 2000) was awarded best of category and first place in the 2017 Intel International Science and Engineering Fair for his math project. He also received the Intel Foundation Cultural and Scientific Visit to China Award. He attends the Methacton High School, Eagleville, Pennsylvania, U.S.A. || 
|-id=163
| 34163 Neyveli ||  || Pranav Sundar Neyveli (born 2000) was awarded second place in the 2017 Intel International Science and Engineering Fair for his computational biology and bioinformatics project. He attends the Mills E. Godwin High School, Henrico, Virginia, U.S.A. || 
|-id=164
| 34164 Anikacheerla ||  || Anika Cheerla (born 2001) was awarded second place in the 2017 Intel International Science and Engineering Fair for her robotics and intelligent machines team project. She attends the Monta Vista High School, Cupertino, California, U.S.A. || 
|-id=165
| 34165 Nikhilcheerla ||  || Nikhil Cheerla (born 1999) was awarded second place in the 2017 Intel International Science and Engineering Fair for his robotics and intelligent machines team project. He attends the Monta Vista High School, Cupertino, California, U.S.A. || 
|-id=166
| 34166 Neildeshmukh ||  || Neil Deshmukh (born 2002) was awarded second place in the 2017 Intel International Science and Engineering Fair for his systems software project. He attends the Moravian Academy, Bethlehem, Pennsylvania, U.S.A. || 
|-id=172
| 34172 Camillemiles ||  || Camille Alden Miles (born 1999) was awarded best of category and first place in the 2017 Intel International Science and Engineering Fair for her energy project. She also received the Intel Foundation Cultural and Scientific Visit to China Award. She attends the Niceville High School, Niceville, Florida, U.S.A. || 
|-id=175
| 34175 Joshuadong ||  || Joshua Dong (born 1999) was awarded second place in the 2017 Intel International Science and Engineering Fair for his engineering mechanics project. He attends the North Carolina School of Science and Mathematics, Durham, North Carolina, U.S.A. || 
|-id=176
| 34176 Balamurugan ||  || Vishaal N. Balamurugan (born 2000) was awarded second place in the 2017 Intel International Science and Engineering Fair for his biochemistry project. He attends the North Oldham High School, Goshen, Kentucky, U.S.A. || 
|-id=177
| 34177 Amandawilson ||  || Amanda Grace Wilson (born 2000) was awarded first place in the 2017 Intel International Science and Engineering Fair for her plant sciences project. She attends the Northwestern High School, Kokomo, Indiana, U.S.A. || 
|-id=178
| 34178 Sarahmarie ||  || Sarah Marie Romanelli (born 1999) was awarded second place in the 2017 Intel International Science and Engineering Fair for her translational medical science project. She attends the Oceanside High School, Oceanside, New York, U.S.A. || 
|-id=179
| 34179 Bryanchun ||  || Bryan Hoo Hao Chun (born 1998) was awarded second place in the 2017 Intel International Science and Engineering Fair for his energy project. He attends the Oregon Episcopal School, Portland, Oregon, U.S.A. || 
|-id=180
| 34180 Jessicayoung ||  || Jessica E. Young (born 1998) was awarded best of category and first place in the 2017 Intel International Science and Engineering Fair for her animal sciences project. She attends the Palm Beach Central High School, Wellington, Florida, U.S.A. || 
|-id=181
| 34181 Patnaik ||  || Ritik Patnaik (born 2001) was awarded second place in the 2017 Intel International Science and Engineering Fair for his systems software project. He attends the Plano East Senior High School, Plano, Texas, U.S.A. || 
|-id=182
| 34182 Sachan ||  || Kshitij Sachan (born 2000) was awarded second place in the 2017 Intel International Science and Engineering Fair for his cellular and molecular biology team project. He attends the Plano East Senior High School, Plano, Texas, U.S.A. || 
|-id=183
| 34183 Yeshdoctor ||  || Yesh Satyajit Doctor (born 2000) was awarded second place in the 2017 Intel International Science and Engineering Fair for his cellular and molecular biology team project. He attends the Plano East Senior High School, Plano, Texas, U.S.A. || 
|-id=184
| 34184 Hegde ||  || Sahil Hegde (born 1999) was awarded second place in the 2017 Intel International Science and Engineering Fair for his physics and astronomy team project. He attends the Prospect High School, Saratoga, California, U.S.A. || 
|-id=187
| 34187 Tomaino ||  || Shane Tomaino (born 2000) was awarded first place in the 2017 Intel International Science and Engineering Fair for her engineering mechanics project. She attends the Rye Country Day School, Rye, New York, U.S.A. || 
|-id=188
| 34188 Clarawagner ||  || Clara Elizabeth Wagner (born 1998) was awarded best of category, first place, and the Scientific and Cultural Visit to India Awards in the 2017 Intel International Science and Engineering Fair for her biomedical engineering project. She attends the Saginaw Arts and Sciences Academy, Saginaw, Michigan. || 
|-id=189
| 34189 Ambatipudi ||  || Mythri Ambatipudi (born 2000) was awarded second place in the 2017 Intel International Science and Engineering Fair for her computational biology and bioinformatics project. She attends the Saint Francis High School, Mountain View, California, U.S.A. || 
|-id=190
| 34190 Erinsmith ||  || Erin Smith (born 1999) was awarded best of category and first place in the 2017 Intel International Science and Engineering Fair for her behavioral and social sciences project. She also received the Cultural and Scientific Visit to China Award. She attends the Shawnee Mission West High School, Overland Park, Kansas, U.S.A. || 
|-id=191
| 34191 Jakhete ||  || Shantanu Jakhete (born 2000) was awarded first place in the 2017 Intel International Science and Engineering Fair for his animal sciences project. He attends the South Fork High School, Stuart, Florida, U.S.A. || 
|-id=192
| 34192 Sappington ||  || James Donovan Sappington (born 2001) was awarded second place in the 2017 Intel International Science and Engineering Fair for his earth and environmental sciences project. He attends the South River High School, Edgewater, Maryland, U.S.A. || 
|-id=193
| 34193 Annakoonce ||  || Anna Colleen Koonce (born 2000) was awarded second place in the 2017 Intel International Science and Engineering Fair for her plant sciences project. She attends the St. Joseph's Academy, Baton Rouge, Louisiana, U.S.A. || 
|-id=194
| 34194 Serenajing ||  || Serena Liang Jing (born 1998) was awarded second place in the 2017 Intel International Science and Engineering Fair for her biomedical engineering project. She attends the St. Paul Central High School, St. Paul, Minnesota, U.S.A. || 
|-id=197
| 34197 Susrinivasan ||  || Suraj Sai Srinivasan (born 2000) was awarded first place in the 2017 Intel International Science and Engineering Fair for his biomedical engineering project. He attends the Strongsville High School, Strongsville, Ohio, U.S.A. || 
|-id=198
| 34198 Oliverleitner ||  || Oliver Leitner (born 2000) was awarded second place in the 2017 Intel International Science and Engineering Fair for his energy project. He attends the Davidson Academy of Nevada, Reno, Nevada, U.S.A. || 
|-id=199
| 34199 Amyjin ||  || Amy Yue Jin (born 2000) was awarded second place in the 2017 Intel International Science and Engineering Fair for her robotics and intelligent machines project. She attends the Harker School, San Jose, California, U.S.A. || 
|-id=200
| 34200 Emmasun ||  || Emma Sun (born 2002) was awarded second place in the 2017 Intel International Science and Engineering Fair for her behavioral and social sciences team project. She attends the Waterford School, Sandy, Utah, U.S.A. || 
|}

34201–34300 

|-id=202
| 34202 Sionaprasad ||  || Siona Prasad (born 2001) was awarded second place in the 2017 Intel International Science and Engineering Fair for her earth and environmental sciences project. She attends the Thomas Jefferson High School for Science and Technology, Alexandria, Virginia, U.S.A. || 
|-id=204
| 34204 Quryshi ||  || Nabeel Jami Quryshi (born 2000) was awarded first place in the 2017 Intel International Science and Engineering Fair for his biomedical and health sciences project. He attends the University School of Milwaukee, Milwaukee, Wisconsin, U.S.A. || 
|-id=205
| 34205 Mizerak ||  || Evan James Mizerak (born 1999) was awarded second place in the 2017 Intel International Science and Engineering Fair for his animal sciences project. He attends the Wachusett Regional High School, Holden, Massachusetts, U.S.A. || 
|-id=206
| 34206 Zhiyuewang ||  || Zhiyue Wang (born 1999) was awarded second place in the 2017 Intel International Science and Engineering Fair for her biomedical and health sciences project. She attends the West Lafayette Junior-Senior High School, West Lafayette, Indiana, U.S.A. || 
|-id=208
| 34208 Danielzhang ||  || Daniel Danxu Zhang (born 1999) was awarded best of category and first place in the 2017 Intel International Science and Engineering Fair for his biomedical and health sciences project. He also received the Philip V. Streich Memorial Award. He attends the Westview High School, San Diego, California, U.S.A. || 
|-id=215
| 34215 Stutigarg ||  || Stuti Paavani Garg (born 2000) was awarded second place in the 2017 Intel International Science and Engineering Fair for her microbiology project. She attends the Westview High School, Portland, Oregon, U.S.A. || 
|-id=218
| 34218 Padiyath ||  || Manashree Seth Padiyath (born 2002) was awarded first place in the 2017 Intel International Science and Engineering Fair for her environmental engineering project. She attends the Woodbury High School, Woodbury, Minnesota, U.S.A. || 
|-id=219
| 34219 Megantang ||  || Megan Taiyue Tang (born 2000) was awarded second place in the 2017 Intel International Science and Engineering Fair for her earth and environmental sciences project. She attends the York School, Monterey, California, U.S.A. || 
|-id=220
| 34220 Pelagiamajoni ||  || Pelagia Maria Majoni (born 1999) was awarded second place in the 2017 Intel International Science and Engineering Fair for her energy project. She attends the Queen Elizabeth Girls High School, Harare, Zimbabwe. || 
|-id=224
| 34224 Maggiechen ||  || Maggie Shin-Young Chen (born 2000) was a finalist in the 2018 Regeneron STS, and was awarded 1st place at the 2017 International Science and Engineering Fair for her bioengineering project. She attends the Canyon Crest Academy, San Diego, California. || 
|-id=225
| 34225 Fridberg ||  || Kyle Oskar Fridberg (born 2000) was a finalist in the 2018 Regeneron STS, and was awarded best of category, 1st place and the Scientific and Cultural Visit to India Award at the 2017 International Science and Engineering Fair for his chemistry project. He attends the Fairview High School, Boulder, Colorado. || 
|-id=227
| 34227 Daveyhuang ||  || Davey H. Huang (born 1999) was a finalist in the 2018 Regeneron STS, and was awarded best of category and 1st place at the 2017 International Science and Engineering Fair for his cellular and molecular biology project. He attends the Iolani School, Honolulu, Hawaii. || 
|-id=231
| 34231 Isanisingh ||  || Isani Singh (born 1999) was a finalist in the 2018 Regeneron STS, and was awarded 2nd place at the 2017 International Science and Engineering Fair for her genomics project. She attends the Cherry Creek High School, Greenwood Village, Colorado. || 
|-id=233
| 34233 Caldwell ||  || Reese Caldwell (born 2000) is a finalist in the 2018 Regeneron Science Talent Search (STS), a science competition for high school seniors, for his bioengineering project. He attends the Conestoga High School, Berwyn, Pennsylvania. || 
|-id=234
| 34234 Andrewfang ||  || Andrew Fang (born 2000) is a finalist in the 2018 Regeneron Science Talent Search (STS), a science competition for high school seniors, for his medicine and health project. He attends the Jericho Senior High School, Jericho, New York. || 
|-id=235
| 34235 Ellafeiner ||  || Ella Feiner (born 1999) is a finalist in the 2018 Regeneron Science Talent Search (STS), a science competition for high school seniors, for her cellular and molecular biology project. She attends the Horace Mann School, Bronx, New York. || 
|-id=236
| 34236 Firester ||  || Benjamin J. Firester (born 1999) is a finalist in the 2018 Regeneron Science Talent Search (STS), a science competition for high school seniors, for his plant sciences project. He attends the Hunter College High School, New York, New York. || 
|-id=237
| 34237 Sarahgao ||  || Sarah Gao (born 2000) is a finalist in the 2018 Regeneron Science Talent Search (STS), a science competition for high school seniors, for her cellular and molecular biology project. She attends the Montgomery Blair High School, Silver Spring, Maryland. || 
|-id=239
| 34239 Louisgolowich ||  || Louis Golowich (born 2000) is a finalist in the 2018 Regeneron Science Talent Search (STS), a science competition for high school seniors, for his computer science project. He attends Harvard University. || 
|-id=240
| 34240 Charleyhutch ||  || Charley Hutchison (born 2000) is a finalist in the 2018 Regeneron Science Talent Search (STS), a science competition for high school seniors, for his chemistry project. He attends the St. Andrew's Episcopal School, Ridgeland, Mississippi. || 
|-id=241
| 34241 Skylerjones ||  || Skyler Chloe Jones (born 2000) is a finalist in the 2018 Regeneron Science Talent Search (STS), a science competition for high school seniors, for her chemistry project. She attends the Ossining High School, Ossining, New York. || 
|-id=245
| 34245 Andrewkomo ||  || Andrew Komo (born 2000) is a finalist in the 2018 Regeneron Science Talent Search (STS), a science competition for high school seniors, for his computer science project. He attends the Montgomery Blair High School, Silver Spring, Maryland. || 
|-id=246
| 34246 Kopparapu ||  || Kavya Kopparapu (born 2000) is a finalist in the 2018 Regeneron Science Talent Search (STS), a science competition for high school seniors, for her computational biology and bioinformatics project. She attends the Thomas Jefferson High School for Science and Technology, Alexandria, Virginia. || 
|-id=249
| 34249 Leolo ||  || Chiu Fan Bowen Lo (born 1999) is a finalist in the 2018 Regeneron Science Talent Search (STS), a science competition for high school seniors, for his physics project. He attends the Jericho Senior High School, Jericho, New York. || 
|-id=250
| 34250 Mamichael ||  || Michael Yuanchao Ma (born 2000) is a finalist in the 2018 Regeneron Science Talent Search (STS), a science competition for high school seniors, for his mathematics project. He attends the Plano West Senior High School, Plano, Texas. || 
|-id=251
| 34251 Rohanmehrotra ||  || Rohan Mehrotra (born 2000) is a finalist in the 2018 Regeneron Science Talent Search (STS), a science competition for high school seniors, for her chemistry project. She attends the Lynbrook High School, San Jose, California. || 
|-id=252
| 34252 Orlovsky ||  || Natalia Orlovsky (born 2000) is a finalist in the 2018 Regeneron Science Talent Search (STS), a science competition for high school seniors, for her cellular and molecular biology project. She attends the Garnet Valley High School, Glen Mills, Pennsylvania. || 
|-id=253
| 34253 Nitya ||  || Nitya Parthasarathy (born 2000) is a finalist in the 2018 Regeneron Science Talent Search (STS), a science competition for high school seniors, for her behavioral and social sciences project. She attends the Northwood High School, Irvine, California. || 
|-id=254
| 34254 Mihirpatel ||  || Mihir Vipul Patel (born 2000) is a finalist in the 2018 Regeneron Science Talent Search (STS), a science competition for high school seniors, for his computer science project. He attends the Thomas Jefferson High School for Science and Technology, Alexandria, Virginia. || 
|-id=256
| 34256 Advaitpatil ||  || Advait Patil (born 2000) is a finalist in the 2018 Regeneron Science Talent Search (STS), a science competition for high school seniors, for his genomics project. He attends the Lynbrook High School, San Jose, California. || 
|-id=258
| 34258 Pentland ||  || Dylan Pentland (born 1999) is a finalist in the 2018 Regeneron Science Talent Search (STS), a science competition for high school seniors, for his mathematics project. He attends the Newman School, Boston, Massachusetts. || 
|-id=259
| 34259 Abprabhakaran ||  || Abilash Prabhakaran (born 2000) is a finalist in the 2018 Regeneron Science Talent Search (STS), a science competition for high school seniors, for his cellular and molecular biology project. He attends the Cherry Creek High School, Greenwood Village, Colorado. || 
|-id=261
| 34261 Musharahman ||  || Muhammad Shahir Rahman (born 2000) is a finalist in the 2018 Regeneron Science Talent Search (STS), a science competition for high school seniors, for his engineering project. He attends the Westview High School, Portland, Oregon. || 
|-id=262
| 34262 Michaelren ||  || Michael Ren (born 2000) is a finalist in the 2018 Regeneron Science Talent Search (STS), a science competition for high school seniors, for his mathematics project. He attends the Phillips Academy, Andover, Massachusetts. || 
|-id=264
| 34264 Sadhuka ||  || Shuvom Sadhuka (born 1999) is a finalist in the 2018 Regeneron Science Talent Search (STS), a science competition for high school seniors, for his physics project. He attends the Cambridge Rindge and Latin School, Cambridge, Massachusetts. || 
|-id=266
| 34266 Schweinfurth ||  || Raley Schweinfurth (born 1999) is a finalist in the 2018 Regeneron Science Talent Search (STS), a science competition for high school seniors, for her environmental science project. She attends the Oregon Episcopal School, Portland, Oregon. || 
|-id=267
| 34267 Haniya ||  || Haniya Shareef (born 2000) is a finalist in the 2018 Regeneron Science Talent Search (STS), a science competition for high school seniors, for her plant sciences project. She attends the Lincoln Park Academy, Fort Pierce, Florida. || 
|-id=268
| 34268 Gracetian ||  || Grace Tian (born 2000) is a finalist in the 2018 Regeneron Science Talent Search (STS), a science competition for high school seniors, for her mathematics project. She attends the Wellington School, Columbus, Ohio. || 
|-id=271
| 34271 Vinjaivale ||  || Vinjai Vale (born 2000) is a finalist in the 2018 Regeneron Science Talent Search (STS), a science competition for high school seniors, for his computer science project. He attends the Phillips Exeter Academy, Exeter, New Hampshire. || 
|-id=272
| 34272 Veeramacheneni ||  || Teja Sai Veeramacheneni (born 2000) is a finalist in the 2018 Regeneron Science Talent Search (STS), a science competition for high school seniors, for his computer science project. He attends the Archbishop Mitty High School, San Jose, California. || 
|-id=273
| 34273 Franklynwang ||  || Franklyn Hai Wang (born 2000) is a finalist in the 2018 Regeneron Science Talent Search (STS), a science competition for high school seniors, for his mathematics project. He attends the Thomas Jefferson High School for Science and Technology, Alexandria, Virginia. || 
|-id=277
| 34277 Davidxingwu ||  || David Xing Wu (born 2000) is a finalist in the 2018 Regeneron Science Talent Search (STS), a science competition for high school seniors, for his mathematics project. He attends the Montgomery Blair High School, Silver Spring, Maryland. || 
|-id=278
| 34278 Justinxie ||  || Justin Long Xie (born 2000) is a finalist in the 2018 Regeneron Science Talent Search (STS), a science competition for high school seniors, for his space science project. He attends the Harker School, San Jose, California. || 
|-id=279
| 34279 Alicezhang ||  || Alice Anran Zhang (born 2000) is a finalist in the 2018 Regeneron Science Talent Search (STS), a science competition for high school seniors, for her computer science project. She attends the Montgomery Blair High School, Silver Spring, Maryland. || 
|-id=280
| 34280 Victoradler ||  || Victor Adler mentored a finalist in the 2018 Regeneron Science Talent Search, a science competition for high school seniors. He teaches at the Harker School, San Jose, California. || 
|-id=281
| 34281 Albritton ||  || Daniel Albritton mentored a finalist in the 2018 Regeneron Science Talent Search, a science competition for high school seniors. He teaches at the Fairview High School, Boulder, Colorado. || 
|-id=282
| 34282 Applegate ||  || John Applegate mentored a finalist in the 2018 Regeneron Science Talent Search, a science competition for high school seniors. He teaches at the St. Andrew's Episcopal School, Ridgeland, Mississippi. || 
|-id=283
| 34283 Bagley ||  || Michelle Bagley mentored a finalist in the 2018 Regeneron Science Talent Search, a science competition for high school seniors. She teaches at the Centennial High School, Ellicott City, Maryland. || 
|-id=284
| 34284 Seancampbell ||  || Sean Campbell mentored a finalist in the 2018 Regeneron Science Talent Search, a science competition for high school seniors. He teaches at the Phillips Exeter Academy, Exeter, New Hampshire. || 
|-id=285
| 34285 Dorothydady ||  || Dorothy Dady mentored a finalist in the 2018 Regeneron Science Talent Search, a science competition for high school seniors. She teaches at the Cherry Creek High School, Greenwood Village, Colorado. || 
|-id=288
| 34288 Bevindaglen ||  || Bevin Daglen mentored a finalist in the 2018 Regeneron Science Talent Search, a science competition for high school seniors. She teaches at the Oregon Episcopal School, Portland, Oregon. || 
|-id=289
| 34289 Johndell ||  || John Dell mentored a finalist in the 2018 Regeneron Science Talent Search, a science competition for high school seniors. He teaches at the Thomas Jefferson High School for Science and Technology, Alexandria, Virginia. || 
|-id=293
| 34293 Khiemdoba ||  || Khiem Doba mentored a finalist in the 2018 Regeneron Science Talent Search, a science competition for high school seniors. He teaches at the Phillips Academy, Andover, Massachusetts. || 
|-id=294
| 34294 Taylordufford ||  || Taylor Dufford mentored a finalist in the 2018 Regeneron Science Talent Search, a science competition for high school seniors. He teaches at the Cherry Creek High School, Greenwood Village, Colorado. || 
|-id=297
| 34297 Willfrazer ||  || Will Frazer mentored a finalist in the 2018 Regeneron Science Talent Search, a science competition for high school seniors. He teaches at the Buchholz High School, Gainesville, Florida. || 
|-id=300
| 34300 Brendafrost ||  || Brenda Frost mentored a finalist in the 2018 Regeneron Science Talent Search, a science competition for high school seniors. She teaches at the Garnet Valley High School, Glen Mills, Pennsylvania. || 
|}

34301–34400 

|-id=302
| 34302 Riagalanos ||  || Ria Galanos mentored a finalist in the 2018 Regeneron Science Talent Search, a science competition for high school seniors. She teaches at the Thomas Jefferson High School for Science and Technology, Alexandria, Virginia. || 
|-id=304
| 34304 Alainagarza ||  || Alaina Garza mentored a finalist in the 2018 Regeneron Science Talent Search, a science competition for high school seniors. She teaches at the Clear Brook High School, Friendswood, Texas. || 
|-id=307
| 34307 Arielhaas ||  || Ariel Haas mentored a finalist in the 2018 Regeneron Science Talent Search, a science competition for high school seniors. Haas teaches at Canyon Crest Academy, San Diego, California. || 
|-id=308
| 34308 Roberthall ||  || Robert L. Hall mentored a finalist in the 2018 Regeneron Science Talent Search, a science competition for high school seniors. He teaches at the Newman School, Boston, Massachusetts. || 
|-id=310
| 34310 Markhannum ||  || Mark G. Hannum mentored a finalist in the 2018 Regeneron Science Talent Search, a science competition for high school seniors. He teaches at the Thomas Jefferson High School for Science and Technology, Alexandria, Virginia. || 
|-id=312
| 34312 Deahaupt ||  || Dea Michael Haupt mentored a finalist in the 2018 Regeneron Science Talent Search, a science competition for high school seniors. She teaches at the Lexington High School, Lexington, Massachusetts. || 
|-id=313
| 34313 Lisahevner ||  || Lisa R. Hevner mentored a finalist in the 2018 Regeneron Science Talent Search, a science competition for high school seniors. She teaches at the Lincoln Park Academy, Fort Pierce, Florida. || 
|-id=314
| 34314 Jasonlee ||  || Jason Lee mentored a finalist in the 2018 Regeneron Science Talent Search, a science competition for high school seniors. He teaches at the Lynbrook High School, San Jose, California. || 
|-id=316
| 34316 Christineleo ||  || Christine Leo mentored a finalist in the 2018 Regeneron Science Talent Search, a science competition for high school seniors. She teaches at the Horace Mann School, Bronx, New York. || 
|-id=317
| 34317 Fabianmak ||  || Fabian Mak mentored a finalist in the 2018 Regeneron Science Talent Search, a science competition for high school seniors. He teaches at the Westview High School, Portland, Oregon. || 
|-id=319
| 34319 Neilmilburn ||  || Neil Milburn mentored a finalist in the 2018 Regeneron Science Talent Search, a science competition for high school seniors. He teaches at the Plano West Senior High School, Plano, Texas. || 
|-id=320
| 34320 Davidmonge ||  || David R. Monge mentored a finalist in the 2018 Regeneron Science Talent Search, a science competition for high school seniors. He teaches at the Northwood High School, Irvine, California. || 
|-id=321
| 34321 Russellmotter ||  || Russell Motter mentored a finalist in the 2018 Regeneron Science Talent Search, a science competition for high school seniors. He teaches at the Iolani School, Honolulu, Hawaii. || 
|-id=322
| 34322 Marknandor ||  || Mark Nandor mentored a finalist in the 2018 Regeneron Science Talent Search, a science competition for high school seniors. He teaches at the Wellington School, Columbus, Ohio. || 
|-id=323
| 34323 Williamrose ||  || William Rose mentored a finalist in the 2018 Regeneron Science Talent Search, a science competition for high school seniors. He teaches at the Montgomery Blair High School, Silver Spring, Maryland. || 
|-id=324
| 34324 Jeremyschwartz ||  || Jeremy Schwartz mentored a finalist in the 2018 Regeneron Science Talent Search, a science competition for high school seniors. He teaches at the Montgomery Blair High School, Silver Spring, Maryland. || 
|-id=325
| 34325 Terrencevale ||  || Terrence Vale mentored a finalist in the 2018 Regeneron Science Talent Search, a science competition for high school seniors. He teaches at the Broad Run High School, Ashburn, Virginia. || 
|-id=326
| 34326 Zhaurova ||  || Irene Zhaurova mentored a finalist in the 2018 Regeneron Science Talent Search, a science competition for high school seniors. She teaches at the Cambridge Rindge and Latin School, Cambridge, Massachusetts. || 
|-id=351
| 34351 Decatur ||  || Decatur, Alabama, the discovery site (Emerald Lane Observatory) || 
|-id=366
| 34366 Rosavestal ||  || Rosa Vallee Warner, née Vestal, the discoverer's mother || 
|-id=398
| 34398 Terryschmidt ||  || Terry Eugene Schmidt, American meteoriticist || 
|-id=399
| 34399 Hachiojihigashi ||  || The team of Hachiojihigashi, composed of Nishi, Sakurai and Tamai from the Hachioji-higashi High School, is a prizewinner in the sixteenth Satellite Design Contest 2008 for their space experiment proposal || 
|}

34401–34500 

|-id=414
| 34414 MacLennan ||  || Eric MacLennan (born 1990) is a postdoctoral researcher in the Physics Department at the University of Helsinki. He studies the production, physical and chemical evolution, and mobilization of regolith using telescopic reflectance spectroscopy and thermal analysis. || 
|-id=419
| 34419 Corning ||  || Corning, New York, home of a glassworks that makes professional telescope mirrors, including the disk for the 5-m Hale Telescope at Palomar; the one-tenth-scale engineering model of that telescope still resides there, and was used to discover this minor planet || 
|-id=420
| 34420 Peterpau ||  || Peter Pau, Hong Kong-born cinematographer || 
|-id=424
| 34424 Utashima ||  || Masayoshi Utashima (born 1951), a researcher in the field of orbital mechanics in Japan Aerospace Exploration Agency. || 
|}

34501–34600 

|-id=543
| 34543 Davidbriggs ||  || David L. Briggs, American director of the Massachusetts Institute of Technology's Lincoln Laboratory from 1998 to 2006 || 
|}

34601–34700 

|-id=611
| 34611 Nacogdoches ||  || Nacogdoches, Texas an Indian settlement, named for the Nacogdoche Indians. This minor planet was discovered at the Stephen F. Austin State University Observatory, located just outside of the city, || 
|-id=636
| 34636 Lauwingkai ||  || Lau Wing Kai (1965–2003) was a nurse at Tuen Mun Hospital in Hong Kong. During the 2003 SARS epidemic, he selflessly carried out his duty and unfortunately died from the disease. || 
|-id=645
| 34645 Vieiramartins ||  || Roberto Vieira Martins (born 1947) is a Senior Researcher at the National Observatory of Brazil. He works on theoretical and observational activities in dynamics, as well as astrometry of small solar system bodies and their physical characterization through stellar occultations. || 
|-id=666
| 34666 Bohyunsan ||  || Mount Bohyunsan, South Korea, where the discovery site, the Bohyunsan Optical Astronomy Observatory, is located || 
|-id=689
| 34689 Flewelling ||  || Heather Flewelling (born 1979) is an ATLAS Planetary Defense Researcher at the University of Hawai'i (Manoa). Her work includes development of robotic telescopes and data pipelines, studying transient objects, and outreach activities. || 
|-id=696
| 34696 Risoldi ||  || Vairo Risoldi, Italian amateur astronomer || 
|}

34701–34800 

|-id=708
| 34708 Grasset ||  || Olivier Grasset (born 1968), a planetary scientist and professor at the University of Nantes' Laboratory of Planetology and Geodynamics. || 
|-id=716
| 34716 Guzzo ||  || Massimiliano Guzzo (born 1970), Italian researcher at the University of Padua, member of the board of directors of the SIMCA (Società Italiana di Meccanica Celeste e Astrodinamica, Italian Society of Celestial Mechanics and Astrodynamics) || 
|-id=717
| 34717 Mirkovilli ||  || Mirko Villi (born 1961), Italian amateur astronomer, supernova hunter, and founder of the International Supernovae Network || 
|-id=718
| 34718 Cantagalli ||  || Michela Cantagalli (born 1965), daughter-in-law of Italian co-discoverer Luciano Tesi || 
|-id=738
| 34738 Hulbert ||  || Sam Hulbert (1936–2016), American president of the Rose-Hulman Institute of Technology, host to the discovery site, the Oakley Observatory || 
|-id=746
| 34746 Thoon ||  || Thoon from Greek mythology. He was a Trojan warrior killed by Odysseus. || 
|-id=753
| 34753 Zdeněkmatyáš ||  || Zdeněk Matyáš (1914–1956), Czech theoretical physicist || 
|-id=760
| 34760 Ciccone ||  || Madonna (Madonna Louise Ciccone, born 1958) is an American singer, songwriter and actress. She frequently reinvented both her music and image and was named as "Queen of Pop" in the 1980s. Her musical CD Evita has accompanied the discoverer on numerous blinking nights. || 
|-id=778
| 34778 Huhunglick ||  || Henry Hu (Henry Hung-lick Hu; born 1920), Chinese barrister-at-law, co-founder of Shue Yan ("the cultivation of virtue") College, the first privately funded university in Hong Kong || 
|-id=779
| 34779 Chungchiyung ||  || Chung Chi-yung (born 1920), wife of Henry Hu, co-founder of Shue Yan College, see  || 
|-id=791
| 34791 Ericcraine ||  || Eric Craine (born 1946) has been involved in astronomy for nearly 50 years and has published over one hundred research papers and five books. His work includes quantitative sky brightness measurements, stellar photometry and spectroscopy, astronomy education, and medical applications of astronomical imaging techniques. || 
|}

34801–34900 

|-id=817
| 34817 Shiominemoto ||  || Shiomi Nemoto (born 1965) is a volunteer for the Japan International Cooperation Agency. She works for the National Astronomical Observatory of Japan, and was the first secretary of the Japan Spaceguard Association. || 
|-id=838
| 34838 Lazowski ||  || Eugene Lazowski (1913–2006), a Polish medical doctor. || 
|-id=846
| 34846 Vincent ||  || Jean-Baptiste Vincent (born 1983) is a Researcher at the DLR Institute of Planetary Research, Berlin, Germany. He is a planetary scientist studying the formation and evolution of asteroids and comets through their surface properties and activity from ground-based observations and space missions. || 
|-id=854
| 34854 Paquifrutos ||  || Paqui Frutos Frutos, wife of the discoverer. || 
|-id=892
| 34892 Evapalisa ||  || Eva Palisa, great-grand-niece of Johann Palisa, the leading visual discoverer of minor planets || 
|-id=893
| 34893 Mihomasatoshi ||  || Husband and wife Masatoshi Taga (born 1969) and Miho Taga (born 1969) worked for several years at the National Astronomical Observatory of Japan. Masatoshi engaged in the studies of galaxies and astronomical data archive systems. Miho designed the logo for the Japan Spaceguard Association. || 
|}

34901–35000 

|-
| 34901 Mauna Loa || 2699 P-L || Mauna Loa (means Long Mountain), the volcano forms the largest part of the Big Island of Hawaii || 
|-id=919
| 34919 Imelda || 4710 P-L || Imelda Gentile, cousin of Heidelberg astronomer Joachim Schubart || 
|-id=978
| 34978 van 't Hoff || 1901 T-3 || Jacobus Henricus van 't Hoff (1852–1911), a Dutch physical chemist who was awarded the first Nobel Prize in Chemistry in 1901. The award was for his work showing that the laws describing the behavior of very dilute solutions resemble the laws describing the behavior of gases. || 
|-id=993
| 34993 Euaimon ||  || Euaimon, mythological king of Atlantis, son of Poseidon and father of Eurypylos, one of the Greeks that sacked Troy || 
|-id=995
| 34995 Dainihonshi ||  || The Dai Nihonshi is a historical record of Japan, comprising 397 volumes, covering the period from Emperor Jimmu (c. 650 BCE) to Emperor Go-Komatsu (1377–1433). || 
|-id=996
| 34996 Mitokoumon ||  || Mitokoumon is a popular name of Mitsukuni Tokugara (1628–1701), a vice Shogun of the Tokugawa family and a lord of the Mito domain. || 
|}

References 

034001-035000